The Hari River ( or) or Herat River is a river flowing  from the mountains of central Afghanistan to Turkmenistan, where it forms the Tejend oasis and disappears in the Karakum Desert. In its lower course, the river forms a northern part of the border between Afghanistan and Iran, and a southeastern part of the border between Turkmenistan and Iran.

The name of the river derives from the Old Persian word Harawaiah 'river rich in water'.

In Turkmenistan it is known as the Tejen or Tedzhen river and passes close to the city of Tedzhen. To the Ancient Greeks it was known as the Arius. In Latin, it was known as the Tarius.

History 

One theory identifies the Rigvedic Sarayu river with the Hari river. 

A Buddhist monastery hand-carved in the bluff of the river Harirud existed in the first centuries during the prevalence of Buddhism. The artificial caves revealed testimony of daily life of the Buddhist monks.

Course

The river originates in the eastern part of Ghor Province in the Baba mountain range, part of the extensions of Hindu Kush system, and follows a relatively straight course to the west.

In western Afghanistan the Hari Rud flows to the south of Herat. The valley around Herat with the Paropamisus Mountains (Selseleh-ye Safēd Kōh) on the right river bank was historically famous for its fertility and dense cultivation. After Herat, the river turns northwest, then north, forming the northern part of the border between Afghanistan and Iran. Farther north it forms the south-eastern part of the border between Iran and Turkmenistan. The Iran–Turkmenistan Friendship Dam is on the river.

The Afghan-India Friendship Dam (Salma Dam) is a hydroelectric and irrigation dam project located on the Hari Rud in Chishti sharif District of Herat Province in western Afghanistan.

The average annual discharge of the Hari Rud is about 55 m3/s, but during a spring flood in 1939 the discharge went up to 1090 m3/s.

In 2000, the river dried up completely during a 10-month drought.

Bridges

Pulkhatyn Bridge 
An unused stone-bridge of five arches, this falls in the Ahal Region of Turkmenistan.

Pulkhatyn translates to "wealthy woman." In Turkmen lore, the custodian of the bridge was a woman who made a fortune by taxing all travelers; Alexander the Great had apparently refused to pay this fee and crossed further downstream.

See also
2020 drowning of Afghan refugees in the Hari River
Badhyz State Nature Reserve
Kushk River
Rigvedic rivers

References

External links
UNESCO: Minaret of Jam (Press Release No.2002-41) and Minaret and Archaeological Remains of Jam (World Heritage List entry).
University of Texas: A map showing the river (as 'Hariru').
A mention of the Tedzhen river (inaccessible on 2013-06-26).

Rivers of Afghanistan
Rivers of Turkmenistan
International rivers of Asia
Rivers of Iran
Afghanistan–Iran border
Iran–Turkmenistan border
Landforms of Bamyan Province
Landforms of Herat Province
Landforms of Ghor Province
Border rivers